The 1995/96 FIS Freestyle Skiing World Cup was the seventeenth World Cup season in freestyle skiing organised by International Ski Federation. The season started on 6 December 1995 and ended on 23 March 1996. This season included five disciplines: aerials, moguls, dual moguls, ballet and combined.

This season combined events were on world cup calendar only for men and none for ladies. In this season dual moguls were introduced for the first time in world cup calendar. Dual moguls counted as season title and was awarded with small crystal globe separately from moguls.

Men

Moguls

Aerials

Ballet

Combined

Ladies

Moguls

Aerials

Ballet

Men's standings

Overall 

Standings after 42 races.

Moguls 

Standings after 11 races.

Aerials 

Standings after 12 races.

Ballet 

Standings after 10 races.

Dual moguls 

Standings after 3 races.

Combined 

Standings after 6 races.

Ladies' standings

Overall 

Standings after 35 races.

Moguls 

Standings after 11 races.

Aerials 

Standings after 11 races.

Ballet 

Standings after 10 races.

Dual moguls 

Standings after 3 races.

References

FIS Freestyle Skiing World Cup
World Cup
World Cup